Rodrigo de Villa is an Indonesian-Philippine historical drama film released in 1952. It was co-produced by Philippine-based LVN Studio and Indonesia-based Persari.

The film is the first international co-production done by a Filipino film studio with a studio outside the Philippines. Done in Ansco Color, the Rodrigo de Villa is the first Indonesian film production in color.

Two versions of the film were made with each version having a different casting. The Philippine version was directed by Gregorio Fernandez while the Indonesian version was directed by Rempo Urip.

Cast
Rd Mochtar  / Mario Montenegro   as Rodrigo de Villa
Netty Herawaty  / Delia Razon  as Jimena
 Mimi Mariani
 Rendra Karno
 Darussalam
 Soekarsih
 Nana Mayo
 Astaman
 Awaludin
 Djuriah Karno
 A Hadi
 R.H. Andjar Subyanto
 Pete Elfonso
 Dhira Soehoed

Synopsis

In Castille, Queen Isabella and Lozano, a noble man collaborates with the invading Ottoman forces to take over the palace which led to the arrest of King Alfonso and his men including Rodrigo de Villa. Lozano was appointed by the Ottomans as king as a reward for the collaboration and marries Isabella.

Jimena, Lozano's daughter is in a relationship with de Villa. De Villa is the son of Leynes, another noble man. King Lozano's second man fell in love with Jimena however the latter remain loyal to de Villa. Selima, the daughter of the ruler of the Ottoman Empire, releases the former King Alfonso and de Villa due to a conflict with her father. De Villa along with his stepbrothers, Don Juan and Don Pedro mobilizes a force to kick out the Ottomans from Castille. They defeat the Ottomans and King Lozano is removed from the Castillian throne.

References

Films set in Spain
Films set in the Ottoman Empire
1950s historical drama films
Indonesian drama films
Philippine historical drama films
Films directed by Gregorio Fernandez